Imran Nasheed (born 14 August 1988) is a Maldivian professional footballer who plays as a midfielder for G. Dh. Thinadhoo, on loan from Eagles.

International
Imran made his Maldives national football team debut against Yemen in the 2019 AFC Asian Cup qualification play-off.

References

External links
 
 

1988 births
Living people
Maldivian footballers
Association football midfielders
Maldives international footballers
Club Eagles players